The Central District of Dana County is a district (bakhsh) in Dana County, Kohgiluyeh and Boyer-Ahmad Province, Iran. At the 2006 census, its population was 16,498, in 3,823 families.  The District has one city: Sisakht. The District has two rural districts (dehestan): Dana Rural District and Tut-e Nadeh Rural District.

References 

Districts of Kohgiluyeh and Boyer-Ahmad Province
Dana County